The Diocese of Città Ducale (Latin: Dioecesis Civitatis Ducalis) was a Roman Catholic diocese in Italy, located in the city of Cittaducale in the Province of Rieti, in the Lazio region. In 1818, it was suppressed to the Diocese of L'Aquila.

History
1502 January 24: Established as Diocese of Città Ducale (Civitatis Ducalis)
1505 November 8: Suppressed to the Diocese of Rieti
1508 October 17: Restored as Diocese of Città Ducale from Diocese of Rieti
1818 June 27: Suppressed to the Diocese of L'Aquila
1968: Restored as Titular Episcopal See of Città Ducale

Ordinaries
Matteo Orsini (bishop) (24 Jan 1502 – 8 Nov 1505 Appointed, Bishop of Calvi Risorta) 
Giacomo Alfaridio (16 Oct 1508 – 1511 Died) 
Giacomo de Massimi (12 Dec 1511 – 1525 Resigned) 
Felice de Massimi (7 Apr 1525 – 1573 Died) 
Pompilio Perotti (3 Jul 1573 – 4 May 1580 Appointed, Bishop of Guardialfiera) 
Valentino Valentini  (14 Nov 1580 – 1593 Died) 
Giovanni Francesco Zagordo  (7 Apr 1593 – 23 Feb 1598 Appointed, Bishop of Belcastro)
Jorge de Padilla, O.P. (18 Aug 1598 – 1608 Died) 
Pietro Paolo Quintavalle  (23 Mar 1609 – Aug 1626 Died) 
Nicola Benigno  (8 Feb 1627 – 1632 Died) 
Pomponio Vetuli (24 Nov 1632 – 1652 Died) 
Sallustio Cherubini  (8 Jan 1652 – 1659 Died)
Giovanni Carlo Valentini (9 Jun 1659 – Aug 1681 Died) 
Francesco Di Giangirolamo  (12 Jan 1682 – Oct 1685 Died) 
Filippo Tani, O.S.B. (1 Apr 1686 – 1 Jan 1712 Died)
Pietro Giacomo Pichi  (10 Jan 1718 – Mar 1733 Died) 
Francesco Rivera  (22 Jun 1733 – 25 May 1742 Appointed, Archbishop of Manfredonia) 
Angelo Maria Marculli, O.S.A. (25 May 1742 – 10 May 1745 Appointed, Bishop of Bitetto) 
Niccola Maria Calcagnini  (10 May 1745 – 20 Aug 1786 Died) 
Pasquale Martini  (18 Jun 1792 – 1798 Died)

See also
Catholic Church in Italy

References

Former Roman Catholic dioceses in Italy